Jim Shaw (born in 1952) is an American artist. His work is held in the collections of the Metropolitan Museum of Art and the Museum of Modern Art, New York.

Education 
Shaw received his B.F.A. from University of Michigan in 1974 and his M.F.A. from the California Institute of the Arts in 1978.

Work 
Shaw invented O-ism, a pseudo-religion. In 2002, at the Swiss Institute in New York, he exhibited the fictitious studio and paintings of the imaginary O-ist painter "Adam O. Goodman" (or "Archie Gunn").

In 2000 he showed Thrift Store Paintings—a collection of paintings by (mostly anonymous) American amateur artists—at the ICA in London. Adrian Searle of The Guardian said "The paintings are awful, indefensible, crapulous…", "these people can't draw, can't paint; these people should never be left alone with a paintbrush", and "The Thrift Store Paintings are fascinating, alarming, troubled and funny. Scary too, just like America." For Sarah Kent of Time Out: "Critics professing to be gobsmacked by these efforts can never have seen an amateur art show or walked along the railings of the Bayswater road. They should get out more."

In 2012 Rinse Cycle, a retrospective, was shown at the BALTIC Centre for Contemporary Art, in Gateshead in northern England. In 2013 the Chalet Society in Paris showed Jim Shaw: Archives, a selection of items from his collection of amateur art, junk and memorabilia; no original artwork by Shaw was shown. In 2015/16 a survey exhibition, Jim Shaw: The End is Here, was exhibited at the New Museum in New York. In 2017 his show The Wig Museum was the first to be shown at the Marciano Art Foundation in Los Angeles.

Collections
Shaw's work is held in the following permanent collection:
Metropolitan Museum of Art, New York: 8 works (as of 4 October 2022)
Museum of Modern Art, New York: 28 works (as of 4 October 2022)

References 

Living people
20th-century American painters
American male painters
21st-century American painters
21st-century American male artists
Art in Greater Los Angeles
Painters from California
Artists from Michigan
Musicians from Michigan
University of Michigan alumni
California Institute of the Arts alumni
1952 births
Destroy All Monsters (band) members
20th-century American male artists